Like any other medieval city, Tallinn (known as Reval from the 13th century until the 1920s) has inspired many legends.

Origin of the name Reval
One of the defensive towers in the town wall that surrounds old Tallinn is called Kiek in de Kök (Low German: "peek into the kitchen"). There is a sculpture on its wall which depicts a deerhunt in Toompea, a district of old Reval. The deerhunt is said to have given the town its old name, Reval.

According to legend the Danish king Valdemar II was hunting for deer in Toompea when he spotted a beautiful stag. The king liked the animal much and so he ordered it to be caught alive. Unfortunately, the deer escaped, fell from a high limestone bank and broke its neck. In German, Reh-fall means "fall of a deer", and so that is where the name Reval was derived from.

However, the "deer-fall" legend is not supported by any documentary evidence. More likely Reval is derived from the name of the adjacent ancient Estonian county of Revalia (Rävala), and in fact the first recorded occurrences of that name predate the Danish king's first visit to Estonia in 1219 by several years.

The Devil's Wedding 
If you happen to be standing near the so-called Cat's Well on Rataskaevu Street, look up at house number 16 and you'll notice something odd. One of the windows on the top floor is bricked up from the inside, and has false curtains painted on the inside. This 15th century house happens to be the subject of Tallinn's most famous ghost legend, a story called "The Devil’s Wedding". The tale goes like this: Long ago, the landlord of this house, desperate for money and nearly suicidal, was approached by a mysterious, cloaked man who offered a huge sum of money to rent the upstairs flat for a party. The renter's only condition was complete privacy. The landlord readily agreed. During the evening in question, loud noises were heard, as if a hundred guests were tramping up the stairs, and an ungodly racket issued from the room. Precisely at 1 o’clock the sound abruptly stopped, as if the party had simply vanished. The next day the landlord's servant, who had been spying through the keyhole, was found mortally ill. Before dying, the servant claimed to have seen the Devil himself having a wedding party in the flat.

Legend of Lake Ülemiste
In the Lake Ülemiste, the largest lake surrounding Tallinn, there is boulder called Lindakivi ("Linda's rock"). In Estonian mythology, it is believed to be one of the boulders Linda was supposed to carry to Kalev's grave at Toompea, but which fell off her apron. She sat on the boulder and cried, thus creating the lake.

The semi-legendary-mythological "Ülemiste Elder" (Estonian: Ülemiste vanake) is believed to live in the lake. If anyone should meet him, then he is believed to ask: "Is Tallinn ready yet?". If then the other person answered "yes", then he would flood the city. Thus, the correct answer would be: "No, there is much to be done yet". This tale is sometimes viewed as an explanation why Tallinn is building/growing all the time.

The legend of Oleviste Church 
A long time ago Tallinn was growing pretty slowly. All the inhabitants wanted Tallinn to be a big seaport, but the merchant ships would not come to Tallinn. Then someone got a very interesting idea: to build a church with such a high tower that nobody had ever seen before. The ships would see the church from the open sea and would come to Tallinn with their goods. Everybody liked the idea. But where would they find such a craftsman to build such a church? Suddenly out of nowhere came a craftsman who applied for the job. Citizens gladly accepted him, but he asked a very high price for his job - ten barrels of gold with one strange condition: if someone would find out his name, then he would work for free. Of course, the citizens agreed. The craftsman started working very fast and the people in Tallinn were getting dimmer and dimmer. Every evening they would come to him and say different names hoping that that would be his name. The church was almost finished. The citizens of Tallinn were getting more and more scared. Then they sent a spy to his wife, and he overheard how she was singing to her baby: Sleep my baby, tomorrow our Olev is coming back and will bring us ten barrels of gold! The spy rushed back into the city. The craftsman was on the roof of the church, placing the cross. When the people started calling him: Hey, Olev! Make sure the cross is straight! When Olev heard his name he understood that he wouldn't get gold! He let the cross go and fell to the ground. At the same moment his body turned into stone.
This legend is reenacted at Tallinn Legends, Tallinn's museum of history and folklore.

References

Culture in Tallinn
Tallinn
Tallinn
History of Tallinn